HMS Rocket was the lead ship of her class of three destroyers built for the Royal Navy in the 1890s. Completed in 1895 she served mostly in home waters and was sold for scrap in 1912.

Description
Ordered as part of the 1893–1894 Naval Programme, the Rocket-class torpedo boat destroyers were J & G Thompson's first such ships. They were powered by a pair of triple-expansion steam engines, each driving a single propeller shaft using steam provided by four Normand boilers. Their crew numbered 53 officers and ratings.

The ships were armed with a single quick-firing (QF) 12-pounder (3 in (76 mm) Mk I gun and five QF 6-pounder Mk I Hotchkiss guns in single mounts. Their torpedo armament consisted of two rotating torpedo tubes for 18-inch (450 mm) torpedoes, one mount amidships and the other on the stern.

Construction and career
Rocket was ordered on 3 November 1893 for delivery within 12 months. The ship was laid down as Yard number 269 by J & G Thompson at its Clydebank shipyard on 14 February 1894, launched on 14 August and completed in July 1895.

After her commission she served at the North America and West Indies Station under the command of Lieutenant Adolphus Huddlestone Williamson. She was ordered to return home in early 1902, but the order was cancelled and she was still in North American waters when she was at Halifax, Nova Scotia in September, and then visited Trinidad in December 1902.

In 1910, Rocket was disarmed, and used for radio experiments. The ship was sold for scrap on 10 April 1912 to Ward of Preston.

References

Bibliography

 

Rocket-class destroyers
Ships built on the River Clyde
1894 ships
A-class destroyers (1913)